Vincent Dorel (born 21 March 1992) is a French professional footballer who plays as a goalkeeper.

Career

Dorel began his career with Stade Rennais in 2002.
He went through all categories from youth academy to First Team. Following ten years at Stade Rennais, Dorel was released by the club in summer 2012.

After leaving Stade Rennais he signed at Les Herbiers in July 2012.

In summer 2013 Dorel signed a one-year contract at GSI Pontivy as a first choice. Dorel made his club debut on 17 August 2013 against Villenave. Gsi Pontivy won the match 3–0 win giving the goalkeeper his first clean sheet with the club. He was named in the Team of year decided by all managers of the league. He earned Best goalkeeper of the league award this season.

Dorel signed at Le Poiré-sur-Vie in National (the third level of French football). Dorel started his first National game against Epinal on 8 August 2014, keeping a clean sheet in a 2–0 away victory. In despite of 12th Position on the table Le Poiré-sur-Vie were relegated to the equivalent of the English National League because of financial sanctions.

He joined English League Two club Plymouth Argyle in March 2016.
He made his professional debut on 7 May 2016 in a 5–0 win over Hartlepool United.

On 10 May 2017, Dorel was one of nine players released by Plymouth Argyle following the end of the 2016–17 season.

On 1 September 2017 Dorel signed for Torquay United on a non contract basis. He made his debut the following day. He went on to sign a professional contract with the club and became 1st choice keeper for the club signing a contract until the end of the season

Career statistics

References

External links
 
 

1992 births
Living people
Footballers from Rennes
French footballers
Association football goalkeepers
Les Herbiers VF players
GSI Pontivy players
Championnat National players
Vendée Poiré-sur-Vie Football players
English Football League players
Plymouth Argyle F.C. players
National League (English football) players
Torquay Town F.C. players
Liga II players
FCV Farul Constanța players
French expatriate footballers
French expatriate sportspeople in England
Expatriate footballers in England
French expatriate sportspeople in Romania
Expatriate footballers in Romania